Daviess County Airport  is a county-owned public-use airport located three nautical miles (6 km) northeast of the central business district of Washington, a city in Daviess County, Indiana, United States.

Although most U.S. airports use the same three-letter location identifier for the FAA and IATA, this airport is assigned DCY by the FAA but has no designation from the IATA.

Facilities and aircraft 
It has two runways; one asphalt paved runway designated 18/36 which measures 4,615 by 75 feet (1,407 x 23 m) and one turf runway designated 9/27 which measures 2,650 by 150 feet (808 x 46 m).

For the 12-month period ending December 31, 2019, the airport had 2,803 aircraft operations, an average of 8 per day: 99% general aviation and less than 1% air taxi. In January 2022, there were 30 aircraft based at this airport: 26 single-engine, 3 multi-engine and 1 jet.

References

External links 
 Aerial photo as of 29 March 1998 from USGS The National Map
 
 

Airports in Indiana
Transportation buildings and structures in Daviess County, Indiana